Michael Faulkender is an associate dean of master's programs and professor of finance at the Robert H. Smith School of Business at the University of Maryland. He is known for his research on executive compensation and the corporate tax practices of multinational firms.

In March 2018, President Donald Trump nominated Faulkender to be Assistant Secretary of the Treasury for Economic Policy.

As associate dean at Maryland Smith, he helped create the business school’s online master of science degree in business analytics.

Research 
Faulkender was awarded the Barclays Global Investors' Michael J. Brennan Best Paper Award in the Review of Financial Studies in 2013, for "Investment and Capital Constraints: Repatriations Under the American Jobs Creation Act," co-authored with Mitchell Petersen. Faulkender was a runner-up for that prize in 2006.

Education 
Professor Faulkender received B.S. in Managerial Economics from the University of California, Davis in 1994 and his PhD in finance from Northwestern University in June 2002.

References 

Living people
Year of birth missing (living people)
Place of birth missing (living people)
University of Maryland, College Park faculty
University of California, Davis alumni
Northwestern University alumni
United States Assistant Secretaries of the Treasury
Trump administration personnel